Terry Campbell (born July 1, 1968) is a Canadian-born German former professional ice hockey player.

Prior to turning professional, Campbell attended Union College where he played three seasons (1987–1991) of college hockey with the Union Dutchmen men's ice hockey team.

Campbell has played 260 games in the Deutsche Eishockey Liga. In 1999 he played with the Germany men's national ice hockey team, competing in the 'B' Pool at the 1999 Men's World Ice Hockey Championships.

References

External links

1968 births
Augsburger Panther players
EC Bad Tölz players
SC Bietigheim-Bissingen players
Canadian ice hockey centres
Essen Mosquitoes players
German ice hockey players
ERC Ingolstadt players
Iserlohn Roosters players
Living people
SC Riessersee players
Saschen Füchse players
Sportspeople from North York
Ice hockey people from Toronto
Union Dutchmen ice hockey players